Luiz Henrique  (November 25, 1938 – July 9, 1985), also known as Luiz Henrique Rosa, was a Brazilian musician. He was born in the city of Tubarão and died in Florianópolis.

In 1963 luiz Henrique recorded his first LP: “A Bossa Moderna de Luiz Henrique" and reached the top of the charts all over the country with songs like: ”Sambou, sambou”, “No balanço do mar” and “Vou andar por aí”. In 1965, while the Bossa Nova fever lived its prime in Brazil, Luiz Henrique went to the United States, following the trend of his time. In New York he met and worked with several great names of the American music scene such as Stan Getz, Oscar Brown Jr., Billy Butterfield and Bobby Hacket and also with lots of Brazilian musicians like Sivuca, Hermeto Pascoal, Walter Wanderley, João Gilberto, Airton Moreira. with them Luiz Henrique composed and recorded many musics, in many LP's. Also during this period that he met the actress and singer Liza Minnelli. The strong friendship they had brought the star to Florianópolis in the carnival of 1979, invited by Luiz Henrique. The musician remained in the US until December 1971, when he returned to his beloved island (Florianópolis). In 1976 he released his last LP: “Mestiço”, with tracks recorded in Rio de Janeiro and in Hollywood. On the 9th of July 1985, the year he would complete 25 years of career, Luiz Henrique died at the age of 46, in a brutal car accident in Florianópolis.

Discography
 1961 : Garota da Rua da Praia
 1963 : A Bossa Moderna de Luiz Henrique
 1967 : Barra Limpa (Verve Records)
 1967 : Popcorn
 1967 : Bobby, Billy & Brazil (Verve)
 1968 : Finding a New Friend (with Oscar Brown, Jr.)
 1968 : Listen to Me
 1968 : Joy 66
 1968 : The Electric Experiment is Over (Noel Harrison)
 1975 : Mestiço

References

External links

 Official website (Portuguese)

 Official website (English)
 Spotify
 Apple Music
 Official Youtube Channel
 Official Instagram

1938 births
1985 deaths
Verve Records artists
Brazilian guitarists
Brazilian male guitarists
20th-century guitarists
20th-century male musicians